Sunnyside is a residential area of Hitchin in Hertfordshire. It was built in 1926 by Hitchin Urban District Council to house those displaced by slum clearance in the Queen Street area of the town centre. The estate consists of Sunnyside Road, Wedmore Road, Kendale Road, Waltham Road and Pulters Way.

Areas of Hitchin